Luigi Silvestri (born 22 January 1993) is an Italian professional footballer who plays as a centre back for  club Cesena.

Club career
In September 2020, Silvestri joined to Serie C club Avellino.

On 21 July 2022, Silvestri returned to Siena.

On 19 January 2023, Silvestri signed a 1.5-year contract with Cesena.

Career statistics

Club

References

External links 
 
 
 

1993 births
Living people
Footballers from Palermo
Italian footballers
Association football defenders
Serie C players
Serie D players
Palermo F.C. players
U.S. Salernitana 1919 players
S.S.D. Città di Campobasso players
A.C.R. Messina players
A.C.N. Siena 1904 players
A.S. Melfi players
Paganese Calcio 1926 players
U.S. Vibonese Calcio players
Potenza Calcio players
U.S. Avellino 1912 players
Cesena F.C. players